The Broad Street School is a historic former school building at 100 Broad Street in Norwich, Connecticut.  The school was designed by New York City architect Wilson Potter and built in 1897.  It is a well-executed and well-preserved example of Romanesque styling, and was the largest school built as part of a major construction program by the city.  The schoolhouse was listed on the National Register of Historic Places on January 19, 1984.  It has been converted to residential use.

Description and history
The Broad Street School building is located in a residential area north of downtown Norwich, on a lot bounded on the north by Rockwell Street and the south by Broad Street.  It is a two-story masonry structure, with a granite foundation, yellow brick exterior with trim elements of brown brick and granite, and slate hip roof.  It is T-shaped in layout, with a central block flanked by slightly projecting wings, and a projecting section at the rear.  The central block facade is fronted by a project porch with an arcade of round-arch openings topped by a low balustrade.  The arches are finished in brown brick, with a brick stringcourse separating the arches from the porch eave.

The school was built in 1897 to a design by Wilson Potter, a well-known New York City architect who had already executed several commissions for Connecticut school districts.  The building's relatively high-style architecture is probably due in part to its placement in what was at the time Norwich's elite residential neighborhood.  The school exemplified state-of-the-art thinking about school buildings, providing high ceilings with well-lit classrooms, facilities segregated by grade and sex, and indoor plumbing.  The school was among those featured in a state education commissioner's report in 1902.  The school close in the late 1970s, and has been converted to residential use.

See also
National Register of Historic Places listings in New London County, Connecticut

References

School buildings on the National Register of Historic Places in Connecticut
School buildings completed in 1897
Buildings and structures in Norwich, Connecticut
National Register of Historic Places in New London County, Connecticut